Island Trader is a 1982 Australian TV movie directed by Howard Rubie and starring John Ewart, Sancho Gracia, Eric Oldfield and Ruth Cracknell.

It was written by Ron McLean for Reg Grundy Productions.

Plot
A plane crashes with treasure and kids go looking for it.

External links

Island Trader at AustLit

Australian television films
1982 films
Films directed by Howard Rubie